Hokah can refer to a location in the United States:

 Hokah, Minnesota, a small city
 Hokah Township, Houston County, Minnesota

See also
 Hookah